Marco de Paula (born 22 April 1977 in Sevilla) is a Spanish actor. He studied with  Ofelia Angélica, Juan Carlos Corazza, Adam Black y Babdo Piernas. He has acted in theater, film and television, advertising has also participated in more than 40 campaigns. Theatrically a member of the theater group La Gaviota, having performed various works.

Filmography

References

External links 
 MarcoDePaula.com

1977 births
Living people
Spanish male telenovela actors
Spanish male film actors
Spanish male television actors
21st-century Spanish male actors